The deputy first minister of Wales is the deputy leader of the Welsh Government. The post was created in October 2000 when Mike German of the Welsh Liberal Democrats was appointed Deputy First Minister as part of a coalition government with Welsh Labour. Since the office was created, the holder has been the party leader of the junior partner in coalition with Welsh Labour.

The last holder was Ieuan Wyn Jones of Plaid Cymru who was also the minister for the Economy and Transport. Ieuan Wyn Jones served in the office as part of the One Wales agreement between Plaid Cymru and Welsh Labour between 2007 and 2011.

List of Deputy First Ministers

See also

First Minister of Wales

Politics of Wales
Government of Wales
First Ministers of Wales
Welsh Government